Yahel may refer to:

 Yahel, a kibbutz near Eilat in the far south of Israel
 Yahel Castillo (born 1987), Mexican diver
 Yinon Yahel (born 1978)